Parasa undulata is a moth of the family Limacodidae. It is found in China (Henan, Guangxi, Anhui, Hubei, Sichuan, Yunnan, Shaanxi and Gansu).

References

Moths described in 1983
Limacodidae
Moths of Asia